Edward Fredkin (born October 2, 1934) is a distinguished career professor at Carnegie Mellon University (CMU), and an early pioneer of digital physics.

Fredkin's primary contributions include work on reversible computing and cellular automata. While Konrad Zuse's book, Calculating Space (1969), mentioned the importance of reversible computation, the Fredkin gate represented the essential breakthrough. In recent work, he uses the term digital philosophy (DP).

During his career, Fredkin has been a professor of computer science at the Massachusetts Institute of Technology, a Fairchild Distinguished Scholar at Caltech, and Research Professor of Physics at Boston University.

Early life and education

At age 19, Fredkin left California Institute of Technology (Caltech) after a year to join the United States Air Force (USAF) to become a fighter pilot. Fredkin’s computer career started in 1956 when the air force assigned him to MIT Lincoln Laboratory where he worked on the SAGE computer.

Career
Fredkin has worked with a number of companies in the computer field and has held academic positions at a number of universities. He is a computer programmer, a pilot, an advisor to businesses and governments, and a physicist. His main interests concern digital computer-like models of basic processes in physics.

Fredkin's initial focus was physics; however, he became involved with computers in 1956 when he was sent by the Air Force, where he had trained as a jet pilot, to the MIT Lincoln Laboratory. On completing his service in 1958, Fredkin was hired by J. C. R. Licklider to work at the research firm, Bolt Beranek & Newman (BBN).  After seeing the PDP-1 computer prototype at the Eastern Joint Computer Conference in Boston, in December 1959, Fredkin recommended that BBN purchase the very first PDP-1 to support research projects at BBN. The new hardware was initially delivered with no software whatsoever.

Fredkin wrote a PDP-1 assembler language called FRAP (Free of Rules Assembly Program, also sometimes called Fredkin's Assembly Program), and its first operating system (OS).  He organized and founded the Digital Equipment Computer Users' Society (DECUS) in 1961, and participated in its early projects.  Working directly with Ben Gurley, the designer of the PDP-1, Fredkin designed significant modifications to the hardware to support time-sharing via the BBN Time-Sharing System. He invented and designed the first modern interrupt system, which Digital called the "Sequence Break". He went on to become a contributor in the field of Artificial Intelligence (AI).

In 1962, he founded Information International, Inc., an early computer technology company which developed high-precision digital-to-film scanners, as well as other leading-edge hardware.

In 1968, Fredkin returned to academia, starting at the Massachusetts Institute of Technology (MIT) as a full professor. From 1971 to 1974, Fredkin was the Director of Project MAC at MIT. (Project MAC was renamed the MIT Laboratory for Computer Science in 1976.) He spent a year at Caltech as a Fairchild Distinguished Scholar, working with Nobel Prize-winning physicist Richard Feynman, and was a Professor of Physics at Boston University for six years.

Fredkin has had formal and informal associations with Carnegie Mellon University (CMU) over several decades. His current academic interests are in the area of digital mechanics, which is the study of discrete models of fundamental process in physics. Fredkin has been a Distinguished Career Professor of Computer Science at CMU. and also a visiting scientist at MIT Media Laboratory. , he is Distinguished Career Professor of Robotics at CMU.

Fredkin has served as the founder or CEO of a diverse set of companies, including Information International, Three Rivers Computer Corporation, New England Television Corporation (owner of Boston's then CBS affiliate WNEV on channel 7), and The Reliable Water Company (manufacturer of advanced sea water desalination plants).

Fredkin has been broadly interested in computation: hardware and software. He is the inventor of the trie data structure, radio transponders for vehicle identification, the concept of computer navigation for automobiles, the Fredkin gate, and the Billiard-Ball Computer Model for reversible computing. He has also been involved in computer vision, chess, and other areas of Artificial Intelligence research. 

Fredkin also worked at the intersection of theoretical issues in the physics of computation with computational models of physics. He invented the SALT Cellular Automata family. Dan Miller designed and programmed the Busy Boxes implementation of Salt, with assistance from Suresh Kumar Devanathan.  The early SALT models are 2+1 dimensional quasi-physical, reversible, universal cellular automata, that are second order in time, and that follow rules that model CPT reversibility..

Fredkin's version of digital philosophy
Digital philosophy (DP) is one type of digital physics/pancomputationalism, a school of philosophy which claims that all the physical processes of nature are forms of computation or information processing at the most fundamental level of reality. Pancomputationalism is related to several larger schools of philosophy: atomism, determinism, mechanism, monism, naturalism, philosophical realism, reductionism, and scientific empiricism.

Pancomputationalists believe that biology reduces to chemistry which reduces to physics which reduces to the computation of information. Fredkin's career and achievements have much of their motivation in digital philosophy, a particular type of pancomputationalism described in Fredkin's papers: "Introduction to Digital Philosophy", "On the Soul", "Finite Nature", "A New Cosmogony", and "Digital Mechanics".

Fredkin's digital philosophy contains several fundamental ideas:
Everything in physics and physical reality must have a digital informational representation.
All changes in physical nature are consequences of digital informational processes.
Nature is finite and digital.
The traditional Judaeo-Christian concept of the soul has a counterpart in a static/dynamic soul defined in terms of digital philosophy.

Recent Projects

PDP-1 Restoration Project
Fredkin chaired the PDP-1 Restoration Project, which was able to restore and reactivate the Computer History Museum's PDP-1 computer after seven months of work.

Awards and honors
In 1984, Fredkin was awarded the Carnegie Mellon University Dickson Prize in Science, given annually to the person who has been judged to have made the most progress in a scientific field in the United States during that year. In 1999, CMU established the Fredkin professorship.

Cultural references
A layman's profile of Fredkin, along with a readable explanation of some of his theories, can be found in the first part of Three Scientists and Their Gods by Robert Wright (1988). The section of the book covering Fredkin was excerpted in The Atlantic Monthly in April 1988.

According to biographer Robert Wright, the character Stephen Falken in the film WarGames was modeled after Fredkin.

Further reading
 Robert Wright, "Did the Universe Just Happen?", Atlantic Monthly, April 1988 – article contains extensive biographical content on Fredkin

See also
Fredkin's paradox

References

External links

Digital Philosophy.org 
Did the Universe Just Happen? The Atlantic Monthly, by Robert Wright, 1988.
Two-state, Reversible, Universal Cellular Automata in Three Dimensions by Edward Fredkin,
Information International, Inc.

American computer scientists
American philosophers
Ontologists
Cellular automatists
1934 births
Living people
California Institute of Technology alumni
Quantum information scientists